The Cotton Candy Nebula is an astronomical object in the constellation of Scorpius. It is considered to fall into an unusual category of nebulae known as protoplanetary nebulae or post-AGB stars. A proto-planetary nebulae is an astronomical object that is in a stellar evolution phase where the star begins to discard its outer layers and is about to proceed to becoming a true planetary nebula, which is another astronomical object made up mostly of gaseous materials that was originally discovered by the IRAS satellite. IRAS was launched in January 1982 and overlooked about 97 percent of the sky. It is also known as IRAS 17150-3224.  It is a good example of a DUPLEX-type protoplanetary nebula.

The Cotton Candy Nebula is difficult to spot considering it is only 16′′ long and hardly shines. Michael E. Bakich is an Astronomy senior editor and has studied the Cotton Candy Nebula. He has confirmed that the way to spot the nebula is with the help of a 16'' scope. With the help of the IRAS 17150-3224 and the nebulae being in the perfect position where the starlight is blocked, we were able to examine the ring-like structures that "cocoon" the nebula as astronomer Sun Kwok put it. The spherical ring structures around the nebulae are created throughout the red-giant stage which is the ultimate stage in stellar evolution.

References

Protoplanetary nebulae
Scorpius (constellation)